The Omroepvereniging VARA, the VARA Broadcasting Association, was a Dutch public broadcasting association primarily operating in the fields of television, radio, publishing and interactive media. It was a member of Netherlands Public Broadcasting.

History
The association was founded in 1925 as the Vereeniging van Arbeiders Radio Amateurs (Association of Worker Radio Amateurs). The name was changed to Omroepvereniging VARA in 1957 and is no longer an acronym.

VARA originally focused on labour and socialism. In the era of Dutch pillarization the association had close links to the Social Democratic Workers Party and its successor, the Labour Party. For many years VARA's chairmen, such as Marcel van Dam and André Kloos, were prominent members of the party. Although the connection between the two organizations loosened, affinities remain, such as a large overlap between their respective support bases.

On 7 March 2002, VARA adopted its final logo which consists of a red cube bearing an exclamation mark alongside the word "VARA" in its new, trademark font.

On 1 January 2014, VARA was merged with BNN to form BNN-VARA.

Programming

Selection of domestic programmes 
 2 voor 12 (1971-1981 and 1991-present), a quiz show hosted most recently by Astrid Joosten
 Kassa (1989–present)
 Kinderen geen bezwaar (2004–2013)
 Kinderen voor Kinderen (1980–present)
 Mike and Thomas Show (2005-2009), a panel game show
 Pauw & Witteman (2006-2014), a live programme about current events, presented by Jeroen Pauw and Paul Witteman
 Sonja (1983–2006), a talk show hosted by Sonja Barend
 De Wereld Draait Door (2005–2020), a live programme about current events, hosted by Matthijs van Nieuwkerk
 Various programmes with Paul de Leeuw
 Zeg 'ns Aaa (1981-1993), popular Dutch sitcom 
 Alfred J. Kwak (1989-1991), an animated children's television series
 Pipo de Clown (1958-1964 and 1970-1980), a children's television series

Miscellaneous
On 5 June 1964, during The Beatles' world tour of that year, VARA organized and recorded for television a Beatles concert in the Treslong Café Restaurant in Hillegom as part of the group's three-day visit to the Netherlands. VARA broadcast a complete summary of the Beatles' visit to the country three days later, on 8 June 1964.

References

External links 

 

Dutch public broadcasting organisations
Netherlands Public Broadcasting
Dutch-language television networks
Television channels and stations established in 1957
Radio stations established in 1925
Dutch companies established in 1925